St Mary's Church, Edmonton, was an Anglican church in Fore Street, Upper Edmonton, Middlesex, England.  It was designed by William Butterfield, consecrated in 1884 and demolished in 1957.  The church was built in red brick with stone dressings.  Its plan consisted of a nave, north and south aisles, and a chancel.  The addition of a southwest porch was attributed to the Chester architect John Douglas.

See also
List of church restorations, amendments and furniture by John Douglas

References

Churches in the London Borough of Enfield
Demolished churches in London
Churches completed in 1884
19th-century Church of England church buildings
Edmonton, St Mary's Church
Former Church of England church buildings
Buildings and structures demolished in 1957